Shorea palembanica (called, along with some other species in the genus Shorea, light red meranti) is a species of plant in the family Dipterocarpaceae. It is a tree found in Peninsular Malaysia and Borneo. It is threatened by habitat loss.

References

Sources
 

palembanica
Trees of Peninsular Malaysia
Trees of Borneo
Critically endangered flora of Asia
Taxonomy articles created by Polbot